The 2006 International Rally Challenge was the inaugural season of the rallying series, which was renamed to the Intercontinental Rally Challenge for 2007 onwards. The season consisted of four rounds and began on May 26, with the Zulu Rally South Africa. The season ended on September 16 with the Rally Sanremo. Giandomenico Basso won the title with Fiat Grande Punto Abarth S2000 ahead of Alister McRae and Paolo Andreucci.

Calendar

Driver Standings

External links
 The official website of the Intercontinental Rally Challenge
 IRC Season 2006 results at ewrc-results.com

Intercontinental Rally Challenge seasons
International Rally Challenge